Pazmany might refer to:
 Péter Pázmány (1570–1637), Hungarian theologian and cardinal
 Ladislao Pazmany (1923–2006), aviation engineer
 Pazmany Aircraft Corporation, manufacturer of small aircraft
Pazmany PL-1
Pazmany PL-4
Pazmany PL-9 Stork

See also
Pázmány Péter Catholic University, private university in Budapest, Hungary